Battersea was a railway station on the West London Extension Railway located on Battersea High Street in Battersea, south-west London. It opened on 1 October 1863 and closed on 21 October 1940 after air raid damage during the Blitz of World War II.

The station was south of Battersea Railway Bridge, at the end of the now pedestrianised area of Battersea High Street by the junction with Simpson Street. It was demolished after closure and no remains are visible today. The site, and an access route from Gwynne Road, continue to remain the property of Network Rail, allowing for potential reconstruction should the need arise in future.

It should not be confused with another station originally named "Battersea", but later renamed to "Battersea Park" located on the London, Brighton and South Coast Railway, adjacent to the pier on the south bank of the River Thames, next to Victoria Railway Bridge. That station opened on 1 October 1860 along with Victoria station and closed on 1 November 1870.

See also 
 Battersea Park railway station
 Battersea Park Road railway station

External links 
 
   
 

Disused railway stations in the London Borough of Wandsworth
Former West London Extension Railway stations
Railway stations in Great Britain opened in 1863
Railway stations in Great Britain closed in 1940
Buildings and structures in Battersea